The sport climbing competition at the World Games 2017 took place from July 21 to July 23, in Wrocław in Poland, at the Nowy Targ Square. 63 sportsmen from 23 nations participated in the event.

Schedule 
All times are in Central European Summer Time (UTC+02:00).

Friday, 21 July 2017
09:00 Men's Boulder qualification
11:30 Women's Boulder qualification
16:00 Men's Boulder final
18:00 Women's Boulder final

Saturday, 22 July 2017
14:00 Men's Speed qualification
14:15 Women's Speed qualification
17:30-18:00 Men's & Women's Speed final

Sunday, 23 July 2017
09:00 Men's & Women's Lead qualification
17:00 Men's & Women's Lead final

Participating nations

 Australia (2)
 Austria (2)
 Belgium (1)
 Canada (1)
 China (1)
 Croatia (1)
 Czech Republic (1)
 Ecuador (1)
 France (8)
 Germany (3)
 Indonesia (1)
 Iran (1)
 Italy (3)
 Japan (8)
 Poland (10)
 Russia (7)
 Serbia (1)
 Slovenia (3)
 South Africa (2)
 South Korea (1)
 Spain (1)
 Ukraine (1)
 United States (3)

Medalists

Medals table

References

External links
 Results book

2017 World Games
Sport climbing at the World Games
2017 in sport climbing